Top Heatseekers are "Breaking and Entering" music charts issued weekly by Billboard magazine. The Heatseekers Albums and the Heatseekers Songs charts were introduced by Billboard in 1991 with the purpose of highlighting the sales by new and developing musical recording artists. Albums and songs appearing on Top Heatseekers may also concurrently appear on the Billboard 200 or Billboard Hot 100.

Albums chart
The Heatseekers Albums chart contains 25 positions that are ranked by Nielsen SoundScan sales data, and charts album titles from "new or developing acts" as determined by the acts' historical chart performance. Once an artist/act has had an album place in the top 100 of the Billboard Top 200, or in the top 10 of any of the Top R&B/Hip-Hop Albums, Country Albums, Latin Albums, Christian Albums, or Gospel Albums charts, the album and later works no longer qualify for tracking on Heatseeker Albums.  This definition means that some artists can still qualify as "new and developing" for years, even decades; The Tragically Hip placed on the Heatseekers Albums chart 10 times between 1992 and 2016, yet they still qualified as "new and developing" as they never had an album in Billboards top 100.

Many artists have bypassed Top Heatseekers altogether by having their initial chart entry debut on the Billboard 200 at position 100 or better.

Songs chart
The Heatseekers Songs chart contains 25 positions, rated by a combination of Nielsen BDS airplay measurements, Nielsen SoundScan sales data, and streaming activity figures from online music sources. Like Heatseekers Albums, this chart tracks titles from "new or developing acts", similarly determined by the acts' historical chart performance. An artist's song is no longer eligible for Heatseekers Songs when the artist has had a song place in the top 50 of the Billboard Hot 100 (or has had a radio song before December 5, 1998).

See also
 Billboard charts
 Bubbling Under Hot 100

References

External links
 Billboard Heatseekers Albums
 Billboard Heatseekers Songs Chart

Billboard charts